Żydów  is a village in the administrative district of Gmina Godziesze Wielkie located within Kalisz County, Greater Poland Voivodeship in west-central Poland.

References

Villages in Kalisz County
Poznań Voivodeship (1921–1939)